Nissim Francez  (Hebrew: נסים פרנסיז; born: 19 January 1944) is an Israeli professor, emeritus in the computer science faculty at the Technion, and former head of computational linguistics laboratory in the faculty.

Early life and education
Nissim Francez was born in Bulgaria. His family emigrated to Israel in 1949. He received his B.Sc. in mathematics and philosophy from the Hebrew University, Jerusalem in 1965. After his military service in the IDF, he studied at the Department of Applied Mathematics at the Weizmann Institute, Rehovot, and received his M.sc. in 1971.
 
He continued his studies there and received his Ph.D. degree in 1976. Francez under the supervision of Prof. Amir Pnueli.

Career
Francez was a research associate at Queen's University Belfast, Northern Ireland in 1976. A year later he joined the Computer Science Department of the University of Southern California (USC), as an assistant professor. 
 
In 1978 He returned to Israel as a lecturer in the Computer Science Department in the Technion, Haifa. A year later he was promoted to senior lecturer, and in 1984 to associate professor. In 1991 he became a full professor at the Computer Science Faculty in the Technion, and in 1996-2006 he was the head of the Computational Linguistics Laboratory at the faculty. 
Francez held the Bank Leumi chair in Computer Science in the faculty from 2000 until 2010, when he retired from the Technion as professor emeritus.
 
In his sabbaticals and summer leaves, Francez has been a research associate at Aiken Computation Lab. at Harvard University in the summers of 1981 and 1982. He was also a visiting scientist at Abo Academy, Turku, Finland (1988) and at the Department of Computer Science, University of Utrecht, The Netherlands (1992). Francez was an Honorary Visiting Professor at the Department of CS, Manchester University (1996-1997), and a Senior Academic Visitor at HCRC, Department of Informatics, Edinburgh University (2002)
and at the School of Computer Science, St Andrews University (2007).

Professional work
Francez was working in IBM Scientific Center, Haifa in 1981 to 1982, and a year later at IBM-T.J.Watson Research Center, Yorktown Heights, New York, United States as a visiting scientist.
In 1983-85  he was working on design and implementation of a Prolog programming environment at IBM Scientific Center, Haifa.
He was a visiting scientist at Microelectronics and Computer Technology Corporation (MCC), Austin, Texas, US in the summers of 1986 and 1987 and 1989-1990
In 1997 he was a visiting scientist at Centrum Wiskunde & Informatica (CWI), Amsterdam.

Research
Francez's current research focuses on proof-theoretic semantics for logic and natural language.
 
He has also carried out work in formal semantics of natural language, type-logical grammar, computational linguistics, unification-based grammar formalisms (LFG, HPSG). In the past he was interested in semantics of programming languages, program verification, concurrent and distributed programming and logic programming.

Membership in professional societies
Francez was a member of the following associations: Association for Computing Machinery (SIGPLAN), IEEE Computer Society, Association for Computational Linguistics (ACL), Association for Logic Programming, International association for Logic, Language and Information (FoLLI), European Association for Theoretical Computer Science (EATCS), Israeli association for theoretical linguistics (IATL).

He was also a Guest Editor (with Ian Pratt-Hartmann) of a special issue of Studia Logica Logic and Natural Language, 2012.

Selected Bibliography

Books

Articles

External links 
 Nissim Francez, Google Scholar
 
 Nissim Francez, at DBLP Bibliography Server

References 

Bulgarian emigrants to Israel
Israeli Jews
Bulgarian Jews in Israel
Theoretical computer scientists
1944 births
Israeli people of Bulgarian-Jewish descent
Israeli computer scientists
Living people
Academic staff of Technion – Israel Institute of Technology